"Never Gonna Let You Go" may refer to:
 Never Gonna Let You Go (Vicki Sue Robinson album)
 "Never Gonna Let You Go" (Sérgio Mendes song)
 "Never Gonna Let You Go" (Faith Evans song)
 "Never Gonna Let You Go" (Tina Moore song)
 "Never Gonna Let You Go" (Esthero song)

See also
 "Never Let You Go" (disambiguation), similarly-titled songs